Fikile Khosa is a professional Zambian footballer plays as a  defender for Red Arrows. She is part of the Zambian Football team in the football competition at the 2020 Summer Olympics.

References

1996 births
Living people
Zambian women's footballers
Zambia women's international footballers
Footballers at the 2020 Summer Olympics
Olympic footballers of Zambia
Women's association football defenders